Hapur Lok Sabha Constituency was a parliamentary constituency in Uttar Pradesh till 2008. It was succeeded by Ghaziabad Lok Sabha constituency after the delimitation carried out in 2008.Now this is the part of Meerut Parliamentary Seat

Assembly Segments

1976-2008

 Ghaziabad
 Muradnagar
 Modinagar
 Hapur
 Garhmukteshwar

Members of Parliament

See also
 Hapur
 List of Constituencies of the Lok Sabha

Former Lok Sabha constituencies of Uttar Pradesh
2008 disestablishments in India
Constituencies disestablished in 2008
Former constituencies of the Lok Sabha